An outcrop or  rocky outcrop is a visible exposure of bedrock or ancient superficial deposits on the surface of the Earth.

Features

Outcrops do not cover the majority of the Earth's land surface because in most places the bedrock or superficial deposits are covered by soil and vegetation and cannot be seen or examined closely. However, in places where the overlying cover is removed through erosion or tectonic uplift, the rock may be exposed, or crop out. Such exposure will happen most frequently in areas where erosion is rapid and exceeds the weathering rate such as on steep hillsides, mountain ridges and tops, river banks, and tectonically active areas. In Finland, glacial erosion during the last glacial maximum (ca. 11000 BC), followed by scouring by sea waves, followed by isostatic uplift has produced many smooth coastal and littoral outcrops.

Bedrock and superficial deposits may also be exposed at the Earth's surface due to human excavations such as quarrying and building of transport routes.

Study
Outcrops allow direct observation and sampling of the bedrock in situ for geologic analysis and creating geologic maps. In situ measurements are critical for proper analysis of geological history and outcrops are therefore extremely important for understanding the geologic time scale of earth history. Some of the types of information that cannot be obtained except from bedrock outcrops or by precise drilling and coring operations, are structural geology features orientations (e.g. bedding planes, fold axes, foliation), depositional features orientations (e.g. paleo-current directions, grading, facies changes), paleomagnetic orientations. Outcrops are also very important for understanding fossil assemblages, and paleo-environment, and evolution as they provide a record of relative changes within geologic strata.

Accurate description, mapping, and sampling for laboratory analysis of outcrops made possible all of the geologic sciences and the development of fundamental geologic laws such as the law of superposition, the principle of original horizontality, principle of lateral continuity, and the principle of faunal succession.

Examples
On Ordnance Survey maps in Great Britain, cliffs are distinguished from outcrops: cliffs have a continuous line along the top edge with lines protruding down; outcrops have a continuous line around each area of bare rock. An outcrop example in California is the Vasquez Rocks, familiar from location shooting use in many films, composed of uplifted sandstone. Yana is another example of outcrops, located in Uttara Kannada district in Karnataka, India.

See also

Digital outcrop model
Geological formation
Geologic time scale
List of rock formations

References

External links
 
 

Rock formations
Rocks